The 1945 Columbia Lions football team was an American football team that represented the Columbia University during the 1945 college football season.  In their 16th season under head coach Lou Little, the Lions compiled an 8–1 record, were ranked #20 in the final AP Poll, and outscored all opponents by a combined total of 251 to 105. The Lions' lone setback was a 32–7 loss to Penn.

Schedule

References

Columbia
Columbia Lions football seasons
Columbia Lions football